The ambassador of Morocco to Australia is the highest diplomatic representative of the Kingdom of Morocco in the Commonwealth of Australia. The ambassador resides in Canberra, Australian Capital Territory. The current ambassador, since February 2022, is Wassane Zailachi. 

The ambassador concurrently serves as non-resident ambassador to New Zealand and the Pacific States of Vanuatu, Kiribati, Fiji, New Zealand, Papua New Guinea and Tuvalu.

List of ambassadors

See also
Australia–Morocco relations
List of ambassadors of Australia to Morocco

References

External links
Embassy of Morocco in Australia

 
Australia
Morocco